Hooray for Tuesday is the debut album by Denver-based Elephant 6 band The Minders. It was released in 1998 on spinART.

Track listing

Personnel 

 Artwork [Art Direction] – M.Willhite,  S. Willhite
 Artwork [Original Painting, Art Direction] –  M. Leaper
 Bass, Vocals –  Marc Willhite
 Drums, Vocals – Rebecca Cole
 Flute, Saxophone [Alto] – Merisa Bissinger
 Guitar, Vocals – Jeff Almond
 Keyboards, Guitar, Producer, Recorded By –  Robert Schneider
 Photography By  –  Steve Gjevre
 Trombone –  Rick Benjamin
 Vocals, Guitar [Rhythm] – Martyn Leaper
 Written-By – Marc Willhite (tracks: 2), Martyn Leaper (tracks: 1, 3 to 10, 12, 13), Rebecca C. Cole (tracks: 11)

The Minders albums
1998 debut albums
SpinART Records albums